Saint Mark's and Saint John's Episcopal Church is a historic Episcopal church located at Rochester in Monroe County, New York.  Completed in 1928, it is architecturally significant as an intact representative example of simple Gothic inspired Arts and Crafts design applied to a neighborhood church edifice.

It was designed by architects Gordon and Kaelber.

It was listed on the National Register of Historic Places in 2004.

References

External links

Churches on the National Register of Historic Places in New York (state)
Episcopal church buildings in New York (state)
Gothic Revival church buildings in New York (state)
Churches completed in 1927
Churches in Rochester, New York
National Register of Historic Places in Rochester, New York